The Cardiff & District League  is a football league covering the city of Cardiff and surrounding areas in South Wales.   The leagues are at the seventh to tenth levels of the Welsh football league system.

Area of the league
Clubs within the bounds of St Mellons, Rumney, Tremorfa, Splott, The Docks, Llandough, Bonvilston, Peterstone, Super Ely, Radyr, Pentyrch, Gwaelod y Garth, Taffs Well, Thornhill, Lisvane, Cyncoed, Pentwyn and Llanrumney are eligible to apply to play in the league.

Divisions
The league is composed of four divisions.

Member clubs 2022–23

Premier Division 

 AFC Rumney
 Cardiff Academicals
 Cardiff Bay
 Cardiff Athletic
 Cwrt Y Vil
 Llandaff Cosmos
 Pentwyn Dynamo
 Splott Albion
 Star

Division One

 Canton Rangers reserves
 Cardiff Academicals reserves
 Cardiff Cosmopolitan reserves
 Clwb Cymric reserves
 Ely Rangers reserves
 Llanrumney Athletic
 St Josephs reserves
 Splott Conservatives
 Tongwynlais reserves

Division Two 

 AFC Whitchurch reserves
 Cardiff Allstars
 Cardiff Villa
 Clwb Sparta
 Grange Albion reserves
 Lisvane Panthers
 Pentyrch Rangers
 Splott Albion 2nds
 St Albans

Division Three 

 AFC Butetown reserves
 AFC Rumney 2nds
 Avenue Hotspur
 Bridgend Street reserves
 Caerau (Ely) district team
 Cardiff Bay reserves
 Cardiff Lions
 Cyncoed Athletic
 Grangetown Catholics Old Boys
 Llanrumney Athletic reserves 
 Splott Albion Old Boys
 Splott Conservatives reserves

Promotion and relegation
Promotion from the Premier Division is possible to the South Wales Alliance League, with the champion of the league playing the other tier 7 champions from the South Wales regional leagues via play-off games to determine promotion.

Champions (top flight division)

1901-02: – Cardiff Albion
1905-06: – Raoth Park Old Boys
1908-09: – Gordon's FC
1930-31: – Barry Amateurs 
1931-32: – Barry Amateurs
1946-47: – Grange Albion.
1959-60: – Docks Albion
1960-61: – Docks Albion
1961-62: – Docks Albion
1962-63: – Cardiff Cosmos
1963-64: – Canton Athletic
1964-65: – St Patrick's
1965-66: – St Patrick's
1966-67: – St Patrick's
1967-68: – St Patrick's
1968-69: – St Patrick's
1969-70: – St Patrick's
1970-71: – St Patrick's
1971-72: – St Patrick's
1972-73: – St Patrick's
1973-74: – St Patrick's
1974-75: – St Patrick's
1975-76: – St Patrick's
1976-77: – Cardiff Rovers
1981-82: – Bridgend Street
1983-84: – Bridgend Street 
1985-86: – Bridgend Street 
1986-87: – Bridgend Street
1987-88: – Grange Albion
1988-89: – Grange Albion
1991-92: – Bridgend Street
1993-94: – Bridgend Street
2006–07: – Pentwyn Dynamo reserves
2007–08: – Grangetown Catholics Old Boys
2008–09: – St. Albans
2009–10: –
2010–11: –
2011–12: – Whitchurch Blues
2012–13: – Canton Liberal
2013–14: – Cardiff Cosmopolitan
2014–15: – Cardiff Cosmopolitan
2015–16: – Creigiau
2016–17: – Pentwyn Dynamo
2017–18: – AFC Rumney Juniors
2018–19: – Canton Rangers
2019–20: – Tongwynlais
2020–21: – Season void
2021–22: – Tongwynlais (promoted via SWAL playoff)''

References

External links
 Cardiff & District League

 
Sport in Cardiff
Sports leagues established in 1897
1897 establishments in Wales
Football leagues in Wales